Krapfia weberbaueri is a plant in the family Ranunculaceae. It is endemic to Peru.

Description 

References 

Ranunculaceae
Flora of Peru